Gergő Kocsis (born 7 March 1994) is a Hungarian football player who plays for MTK Budapest.

Club career
On 20 July 2020 he signed with Polish club Podbeskidzie Bielsko-Biała.

On 27 October 2022, Kocsis returned to his childhood club MTK Budapest.

Club statistics

Updated to games played as of 27 June 2020.

International career
Kocsis was named in Hungary's provisional squad for UEFA Euro 2016 but was cut from the final squad.

References

External links
hlsz.hu 
puskasakademia.hu 

1994 births
Living people
Footballers from Budapest
Hungarian footballers
Hungary youth international footballers
Hungary under-21 international footballers
Association football midfielders
FC Augsburg II players
Fehérvár FC players
Puskás Akadémia FC players
FC DAC 1904 Dunajská Streda players
Diósgyőri VTK players
MFK Karviná players
Zalaegerszegi TE players
Podbeskidzie Bielsko-Biała players
Mezőkövesdi SE footballers
MTK Budapest FC players
Nemzeti Bajnokság I players
Nemzeti Bajnokság II players
Slovak Super Liga players
Czech First League players
Ekstraklasa players
Expatriate footballers in Germany
Expatriate footballers in Slovakia
Expatriate footballers in the Czech Republic
Expatriate footballers in Poland
Hungarian expatriate sportspeople in Germany
Hungarian expatriate sportspeople in Slovakia
Hungarian expatriate sportspeople in the Czech Republic
Hungarian expatriate sportspeople in Poland